is a Japanese footballer who plays for Tochigi City.

Career
After playing for three seasons with Júbilo Iwata and going on loan to Mito HollyHock, Shimizu joined Tochigi Uva FC in March 2018.

Club statistics
Updated to 23 February 2018.

References

External links
Profile at Tochigi Uva FC

Profile at Júbilo Iwata

1992 births
Living people
Chukyo University alumni
Association football people from Gunma Prefecture
Japanese footballers
J1 League players
J2 League players
Júbilo Iwata players
Tochigi City FC players
Association football midfielders